Shadows from the Walls of Death: Facts and Inferences Prefacing a Book of Specimens of Arsenical Wall Papers is an 1874 book by Dr. Robert C. Kedzie (1823-1902) of Michigan. 

The book warns of the dangers then commonly used arsenic-pigmented wallpaper. The book contains 86 samples of said wallpaper. Due to the dangerous amount of arsenic in the work, of the original 100 copies, only five have survived. Most copies were destroyed by the recipient libraries. These are only handled using special precautions for safety. , the remaining copies were held at Harvard University Medical School, the U.S. National Library of Medicine in Bethesda, MD, and the university libraries of Michigan State University and the University of Michigan.  The copy in the National Library of Medicine has been digitized and is freely available.

See also 
Scheele's Green

References

External links 
Full online text at the United States National Library of Medicine

1874 non-fiction books
American non-fiction books
Health and wellness books
Arsenic
Wallcoverings